Two Mothers is a 2014 South Korean daily drama starring Jang Seo-Hee, Lee Chae-Young, Hwang Dong-Joo and Kim Kyung-Nam. It premiered on KBS2 on June 3, 2014, airing every Monday to Friday at 19:50 for 102 episodes.

Plot
Hwa-young believes that Yeon-hee, her brother's ex-girlfriend, drove him to his death. When the unhappily married Yeon-hee is diagnosed with uterine cancer, Hwa-young volunteers to become a surrogate mother for her, all the while planning her revenge. Hwa-young conceives and gives birth, lets Yeon-hee raise the child, then destroys Yeon-hee by trying to take the child back. Later, Yeon-hee tries her best to get her child back. Yeon-hee's husband regrets for letting Yeon-hee go.

Cast

Main characters
Jang Seo-hee as Baek Yeon-hee
Hwang Dong-joo as Jung Byung-gook
Lee Chae-young as Lee Hwa-young / Grace Lee
Kim Kyung-nam as Yoo Sung-bin
Hyun Woo-sung as Lee Myung-woon

Supporting characters
Baek Yeon-Hee's family
Im Chae-Moo as Baek Chul
Uhm Yoo-Shin as Hong Geum-Ok
Son Ga-Young as Baek Joon-Hee
Jung Ji-Hoon as Jung Jin-Woo

Jung Byung-Gook's family
Seo Kwon-Soon as Kwak Hee-Ja
Ji Soo-Won as Jung Jin-Sook
Kim Min-Jwa as Jung Yoo-Mi

Lee Hwa-Young's family
Park Joon-geum as Bae Choo-Ja
Lee Sook as Lee Ssang-Soon
Jeon No-Min as Bae Chan-Sik
Jeon Min-Seo as Lee So-Ra
Park Ji-So as Lee So-Ra (child)

Others 
Lee Chang-Wook as Choi Sang-Doo
Han Kyung-Sun as Lee Gong-Hee
Heo In-Young as Soon-Nam
Lee Jung-Hoon as Oh Ki-Seop
Oh Ji-Young as Moon-Sook
Lee Doo-Seop as Director Lee
Jang Sol-Mi as Young-Eun
Kim Ri-Won as Kim So-Jin
Ahn Hong-Jin as Jin Myung-Suk
Kwon Hyuk-Ho as Jung Byung-Gook
Jung Min-Jin as Lee Dong-Hyun (cameo)
 Ahn Bo-hyun
 Kim Da-hyun

Ratings
In the tables below, the blue numbers represent the lowest ratings and the red numbers represent the highest ratings.

Ratings in the Philippines
In the Philippines, Two Mothers was aired on GMA Network on April 6, 2015 every weekdays at 10:00 a.m. PST. The drama was dubbed in Filipino and ran for 30 weeks having 150 equivalent episodes. It was later re-aired on GMA News TV from June 5 to August 25, 2017.

Awards and nominations

References

External links
  
 
 

Korean Broadcasting System television dramas
2014 South Korean television series debuts
Korean-language television shows
South Korean romance television series
South Korean melodrama television series